Lafayette E. Pitts (born September 24, 1992) is an American football cornerback who is a free agent. He played college football at Pittsburgh, and was signed by the Miami Dolphins as an undrafted free agent in 2016.

Professional career

Miami Dolphins
After going undrafted in the 2016 NFL Draft, Pitts signed with the Miami Dolphins on May 6, 2016. On September 3, 2016, he was waived by the Dolphins during final team cuts. Pitts was signed to the Dolphins' practice squad the following day. On November 7, 2016, he was promoted from the practice squad to the active roster.

On September 2, 2017, Pitts was waived by the Dolphins.

Jacksonville Jaguars
On September 3, 2017, Pitts was claimed off waivers by the Jacksonville Jaguars. He was waived by the Jaguars on October 24, 2017.

Buffalo Bills
On October 25, 2017, Pitts was claimed off waivers by the Buffalo Bills. Pitts was re-signed to a one-year deal on April 16, 2018.

After another season as a core special teams player for the Bills, Pitts signed another one-year deal on February 12, 2019 to remain in Buffalo. He was released on August 31, 2019.

Indianapolis Colts
On December 30, 2019, Pitts signed a reserve/future contract with the Indianapolis Colts. He was waived on September 5, 2020.

Buffalo Bills (second stint)
On October 14, 2020, Pitts was signed to the Buffalo Bills practice squad. He was released on November 3. On December 14, 2020, Pitts re-signed with the Bills practice squad. He was released on January 1, 2021.

Pittsburgh Steelers
On August 6, 2021, Pitts signed with the Pittsburgh Steelers. He was waived on August 28, 2021.

Atlanta Falcons
On November 10, 2021, Pitts was signed to the Atlanta Falcons practice squad. He signed a reserve/future contract with the Falcons on January 10, 2022. He was released on August 23, 2022.

References

External links
 Pittsburgh Panthers bio

1992 births
Living people
Players of American football from Pennsylvania
Sportspeople from the Pittsburgh metropolitan area
People from Duquesne, Pennsylvania
American football cornerbacks
Pittsburgh Panthers football players
Miami Dolphins players
Jacksonville Jaguars players
Buffalo Bills players
Indianapolis Colts players
Pittsburgh Steelers players
Atlanta Falcons players